Kung Mahawi Man ang Ulap (International title: Through It All / ) is a 2007 Philippine television drama romance series broadcast by GMA Network. Based on a 1984 Philippine film of the same title, the series is the third instalment of Sine Novela. Directed by Mac Alejandre, it stars Nadine Samonte, Dennis Trillo and Iwa Moto. It premiered on July 30, 2007 on the network's Dramarama sa Hapon line up replacing Sinasamba Kita. The series concluded on November 9, 2007 with a total of 75 episodes. It was replaced by My Only Love in its timeslot.

Cast and characters

Lead cast
 Nadine Samonte as Catherine Clemente
 Dennis Trillo as Rustan "Stan" Ilustre
 Iwa Moto as Rita Acuesta

Supporting cast
 Gardo Versoza as Pablo Acuesta
 Hazel Ann Mendoza as Chona Acuesta
 Jeremy Marquez as Jojo Acuesta
 Glydel Mercado as Minda Clemente
 Aiza Marquez as Liza
 Vangie Labalan as Rosa
 Ces Quesada as Chayong
 Tyron Perez as Anastacio

Guest cast
 Tommy Abuel as Rogelio
 Kevin Santos as Tencho
 Wendell Ramos as Michael
 Ama Quiambao as Amelia R. Santos
 Chuck Allie as Vincent
 Sheena Halili as Monique

Ratings
According to AGB Nielsen Philippines' Mega Manila household television ratings, the final episode scored a 27.8% rating.

References

External links
 

2007 Philippine television series debuts
2007 Philippine television series endings
Filipino-language television shows
GMA Network drama series
Live action television shows based on films
Philippine romance television series
Television shows based on comics
Television shows set in the Philippines